Martha Nilsson Edelheit (born September 3, 1931, in New York City), also known as Martha Ross Edelheit, is an American-born artist currently living in Sweden. She is known for her feminist art of the 1960s and 1970s, which focuses on erotic nudes.

Early life 
She was born September 3, 1931, in New York City. She always had a knack for creative endeavors, originally having been taught to be a musician. Edelheit's grandparents were immigrants from Romania who kept a kosher home and spoke Yiddish. She lived first in Queens and later at the age of 10 in the Bronx with her parents who were more secular in nature. She attended the High School of Music and Art with Joan Semmel. Edelheit subsequently studied at the University of Chicago from 1949 to 1951, at New York University in 1954 while concurrently studying art with Michael Loew, and at Columbia University in 1955 and 1956, where she studied art history with Meyer Schapiro. In the mid-1950s she married psychoanalyst Henry Edelheit, when he was a medical student at University of Chicago.

Career 

Known for her early works of erotic art, Edelheit was an early pioneer in the feminist art movement. Painting nude male subjects as early as the 1960s, Edelheit was a vanguard of the expression revolution that would gain attention in following decades.

Edelheit's career and array of works are diverse and impressive. She works in series in which her styles would change. The first one being her Abstract Works and Extension Paintings of 1958–1961. This is followed by her Children's Game series of 1960–1962. After which she began to focus on watercolors between the years of 1961–1962. She later returned to watercolors after she moved to Sweden in 2015. Her Watercolor series overlapped with her Flesh Wall series between 1960 and 1966 in which, she displayed a wide variety of themes from human bodies to interiors at the Byron Gallery. This art exposition was a culmination of her success and impact, making even seasoned art viewer such as Leo Castelli blush. During 1962, she began to work with tattooed figures in her works, demonstrating the flesh of the figures she depicts to the viewer to be where the figures dreams and fantasies emerge. Alongside her vast painting portfolio she began to work on body paint sculptures during the 1960s as well. Succeeding this was her Back Paint series between 1972 and 1975. In the year 1975, near the end of Back Paint series she experimented more with Self Portraits. She remarked that the first nude she ever painted with the intent to show anyone else was one of herself so during this time she likely came back to that sentiment. In 1978 she had a pencil on rag series she titled Flesh and Stone which was complete in Sweden. Between 1980 and 1985 she worked with cutouts which she painted on both sides. This coincided with her Paper Doll Book series of 1984 as well as her Tool Paintings. While in Sweden between 1983 and 1986 she worked with monoprints and oil pastels as well as colored pencils, ink and graphite. In 1988, she worked with bronze sculptures and string as her mediums. Following this she did a series of grief paintings; subsequently in 1991 she released Bateaux des Revés in Central Park. Her following works were all done in Sweden and are largely animal portraits due to the fact that she lives on a farm. She did however have her Ice Dancers series of 1998 as well as a series titled USA in 2016 depicting graphic harm done to animals.
Since 1961, Edelheit has participated in numerous group exhibitions, including 11 from the Reuben (1965, Guggenheim Museum), Three Centuries of the American Nude (1975, New York Cultural Center), BLAM! (1984, Whitney Museum of American Art), and Inventing Downtown: Artist-Run Galleries in New York City, 1952-1965 (2017, Grey Gallery, New York University). Throughout the 1970s, as the women's art movement flourished, Edelheit was an active participant in women-only group exhibitions, including Women Choose Women (1973, New York Cultural Center), Works on Paper—Women Artists (1975, Brooklyn Museum), Sons and Others (1975, Queens Museum of Art), and the traveling collaborative feminist installation The Sister Chapel (1978–80).

Womanhero (1977), Edelheit's painting for The Sister Chapel, is a monumental female transmutation of Michelangelo's David, tattooed with images of Nut, Kali, Athena, Diana, and Guanyin to symbolize women's shared power over the course of many centuries.

Edelheit has also done production design for smaller theaters in New York from 1971 to 1974, a number of own experimental art films in the 1970s, demonstrated in a number of contexts in the U.S. and Europe over the years, such as Hats, Bottles & Bones: A Portrait of Sari Dienes (1977) an artist portrait on Sari Dienes, shown including the Museum of Modern Art and is included in collections at the Anthology Film Archives. She has taught in filmmaking 1976 to 1980 and has been invited as artist in residence at Wilson College located in Chambersburg, Philadelphia in 1973, Art Institute of Chicago in 1975, the University of Cincinnati in 1975 and the California Institute of the Arts.

Activism 
Martha Edelheit was a member of Fight Censorship (est. 1973), founded by Anita Steckel. Fight Censorship was composed of several women artists whose work focused on eroticism, including Joan Semmel, Judith Bernstein, Hannah Wilke, Juanita McNeely, Barbara Nessim, Eunice Golden, and Joan Glueckman. They lectured and educated the public about erotic art and the negative effects of censorship.

In 1977, Edelheit became an associate of the Women's Institute for Freedom of the Press (WIFP).

Edelheit was a member of Women/Artist/Filmmakers, Inc, the Women's Caucus for Art (WCA) and an associate member of Soho20 Chelsea Gallery.

Her image is included in the iconic 1972 poster Some Living American Women Artists by Mary Beth Edelson.

Sweden 
Since 1993 Martha Edelheit has been a resident of Sweden. She lives on a farm in Svartsjölandet outside Stockholm after her marriage to her childhood sweetheart Sam Nilsson.

Before moving to Sweden, she painted the human form, drawing on erotic imagery with a mixture of realism and abstraction, but after leaving New York and coming to the Swedish nature-oriented way of life, her work shifted towards animal motifs; something she sees as a manifestation of hope to a wounded world.

Theatre sets 
 The Wonderful Adventures of Tyl, Jonathan Levy] Triangle Theatre, 1971
 Message from Garcia + Was I Good?, two-act play by Rosalyn Drexler, New Dramatists Workshop, 1971
 The Whore and the Poet, by Sandra Hochman + Break A Leg, by Ira Levin, Urgent Theater, 1974

References

External links 
 Byron Gallery Records, Archives of American Art (digitized exhibition announcement and installation photographs)

Living people
1931 births
Artists from New York City
University of Chicago alumni
20th-century American women artists
Feminist artists
American emigrants to Sweden